ARA Veinticinco de Mayo was a protected cruiser that served in the Argentine Navy between 1891 and 1921.

Design 

Veinticinco de Mayo was a steam-powered protected cruiser similar to  built in the same shipyard for the Royal Italian Navy, but improved and larger. Its steel hull had a ram in the bow, and was protected with an armored deck.

Its main battery was two  guns, one at the bow and another at the stern, and four 124 mm quick-firing guns per side. The secondary battery had twelve 47 mm and twelve 37mm quick-fire Hotchkiss guns. It had two masts, in its tops were mounted eight Maxim machine guns. It initially mounted three torpedo tubes, later increased to six. It also carried two steam boats with spar torpedoes.

History 
In 1890 the Argentine government led by President Miguel Ángel Juárez Celman decided to purchase a new cruiser due to the dispute with Chile concerning the application of the boundary Treaty of 1881. The Argentine representative to the United Kingdom, Dr. Luis L. Domínguez, signed a £ 260,000 (1,310,410 Gold Pesos) contract with shipyard W. Armstrong, Micthell & Co., in Newcastle upon Tyne, England, for the construction of a 3,500-ton cruiser which would be called Necochea. Before its completion it was decided to change its name to Veinticinco de Mayo ("25th May"), the tenth Argentine Navy ship with this name, and was launched on March 5, 1890 under that name. Its first commander was Capitán de Navío Ceferino Ramirez, previously in charge of the vessel's construction.

In 1901, commanded by Frigate captain (Spanish: Capitán de fragata) Juan Pablo Sáenz Valiente, the ship was deployed to Río Gallegos due to the incidents in Última Esperanza Sound, which also caused the Chilean government to deploy the cruiser . After that mission Veinticinco de Mayo was sent to Río Santiago in reserve, commanded by Frigate captain Enrique Thorne.

In 1910 the protected cruiser joined the 2nd Division, and participated of the Centenary of the May Revolution, after what it returned to reserve. It was reactivated during the First World War but with a low level of activity.

In the following years was gradually dismantled, and in 1921 it was used only as a coaling pontoon. In the report sent to the Argentine Congress for the period 1927/28, the ship was referred as "inexistent".

See also 
 List of cruisers
 List of ships of the Argentine Navy

References

Notes

Bibliography 
 
 
 
 .

Further reading

External links 
 Cruiser 25 de Mayo - Histarmar website (Historia y Arqueología Marítima - Crucero 25 de Mayo) (accessed 2015-11-21)

Cruisers of the Argentine Navy
1890 ships
Ships built by Armstrong Whitworth